Truth or Dare: 6th Floor Rear Flat is a 2003 Hong Kong film directed by Barbara Wong, starring an ensemble cast featuring Karena Lam, Candy Lo, Juno Mak, Teresa Carpio, Roy Chow, Laurence Chou, and Edwin Siu. The film was considered both a critical and commercial success, and won various awards in both the 23rd Annual Hong Kong Film Awards and the 40th Annual Golden Horse Awards.

Synopsis
The plot revolves around the party-loving residents of the Rear Flat and a drunken deal made in a game of Truth or Dare with the elderly flat owner lady, Suzy; the deal required all the residents to make a wish and make it happen within a year, and whoever fails had to face the consequence of eating Suzy's fecal matter. What started as a joke turned into a seemingly serious matter as the youngsters thrived for their ambition with gusto.

Sequel
Wong directed a 2008 Sequel to the film, 6th Floor Rear Flat: Happy Funeral, starring a new generation of youngsters who take over the Rear Flat after previous residents presumably move out. The ensemble cast includes several Hong Kong hip hop and pop sensations, featuring Elanne Kong, Tian Yuan, and band members of I Love You Boyz and FAMA, as well as veteran Hong Kong actors Eric Tsang and Patrick Dunn. In the sequel, characters make references to the previous residents, and the film also sees cameos from four of the previous residents of the flat, having all returned to visit Suzy after their various successes.

Cast and roles
 Karena Lam - Karena
 Candy Lo - Candy
 Roy Chow - Leo
 Lawrence Chou - Wing
 Patrick Tang - Jean
 William So - Officer Hong
 Teresa Carpio - Wing's mother
 Law Koon-Lan - Miss Kim
 Lawrence Cheng - Jason (voice only)
 Angela Au	
 Wong Chun-chun - Amy (cameo)
 Clarence Hui - Paco
 Sammy Leung - Bo
 Edwin Siu - Edwin
 Courtney Wu - Auction guest

External links
 
 HK cinemagic entry
 loveHKfilm entry

Hong Kong comedy-drama films
2003 films
Films directed by Wong Chun-chun
2000s Hong Kong films